Euphorbia ferox is a species of flowering plant in the family Euphorbiaceae.

References

ferox